Mount Iraya, is a dormant stratovolcano on Batan Island and the highest point in the province of Batanes, Philippines.

Location
Iraya is located on Batan Island, one of the Batanes Islands, in the province of Batanes, in the Luzon Strait, north of the island of Luzon, in the Philippines.

It is the northernmost active volcano in the Philippines.

Physical features

Adjacent volcanic edifice is Mount Matarem.

Volcanic activity

Mount Iraya last erupted in 1454, and the Philippine Institute of Volcanology and Seismology (PHIVOLCS) considers it as one of the active volcanoes in the Philippines.

In 1998, volcanologists recorded seismic swarms which led them to form a monitoring network on Batan Island for several months.  After the swarms of tremors had diminished, the temporary stations in Barangay San Joaquin in Basco, Batanes and another near the crater, were pulled out. Seismicity or any activity relating to Iraya is still monitored by the Basco Seismological Station.

Volcanoes of the Philippines are all part of the Pacific ring of fire.

Mythology
Mount Iraya is a sacred mountain for the Ivatan people. There are two contrasting tales regarding the mountain, the first tale states that the mountain is a mother overlooking her children (the Ivatans) for their protection, while the second tale states that if a ring of clouds appear on top of the mountain, Iraya is notifying the people for preparation due to an inevitable death of an elder, usually due to natural causes.

See also
 List of active volcanoes in the Philippines
 List of potentially active volcanoes in the Philippines
 List of inactive volcanoes in the Philippines
 Philippine Institute of Volcanology and Seismology

References

External links

Stratovolcanoes of the Philippines
Subduction volcanoes
Volcanoes of the Luzon Strait
Mountains of the Philippines
Landforms of Batanes
Active volcanoes of the Philippines
Pleistocene stratovolcanoes
Holocene stratovolcanoes